Syzygium pseudofastigiatum, known as the Claudie satinash is a rare rainforest tree of tropical Queensland, Australia. It can grow to 35 metres tall.

References

 http://www.legislation.qld.gov.au/LEGISLTN/SLS/2000/00SL354.pdf

pseudofastigiatum
Myrtales of Australia
Flora of Queensland
Trees of Australia
Taxa named by Bernard Hyland